East Corrimal is a northern seaside suburb of Wollongong, New South Wales, Australia. Predominantly residential, the suburb includes Corrimal High School and Corrimal East Public School, as well as Corrimal Beach and Corrimal Beach Tourist Park at the eastern end. A public park was opened in 1959 to the west of the high school and north of the primary school, named Phil Adams Park, which features tall trees, paths and several seats.

The South Coast railway line forms the western boundary of East Corrimal and separates it from its sister suburb Corrimal. It is served by Corrimal railway station.

The suburb takes its name from a point on the nearby Illawarra escarpment which was known as Mount Corrimal (named after the Aboriginal Dreamtime warrior Kurimul) and now called Broker's Nose.

Schools

Corrimal High School is located in East Corrimal. Corrimal East Public School is a local public primary school, established in 1952.

See also
 Broker's Nose
 Corrimal
 Corrimal High School
 Corrimal railway station

References

Suburbs of Wollongong